Rojas is a surname found throughout the Spanish-speaking world, especially in Latin America. 
Rojas may refer to:

People

A
Adrián Rojas (born 1977), Chilean professional football player and father
Aguelmis Rojas (born 1978), Cuban long-distance runner
Agustín de Rojas Villandrando (1572–1618), Spanish writer and actor
Alberto Müller Rojas (1935–2010), Venezuelan politician and general
Alberto Rojas (born 1965), Mexican-born prelate of the Catholic Church
Alberto Rojas Jiménez (1900–1934), Chilean poet and journalist
Alejandro González Rojas (born 1955), former Costa Rican goalkeeper
Alexis Rojas (born 1972), Colombian road cyclist
 Alfredo Rojas (Argentine footballer) (born 1937)
 Alfredo Rojas (Chilean footballer) (born 1985)
 Alfredo Rojas (Peruvian footballer) (born 1991)
Anderson Rojas, amateur boxer from Ecuador
Andrea Rojas, fictional character from DC Comics
Andres Almonaster y Rojas (1724–1798), Spanish civil servant of New Orleans
Ángel Clemente Rojas (born 1944), former Argentine footballer
Ángel Dolores Rojas (1851–1918), Argentine politician
Ángel Rojas (born 1985), Chilean footballer who plays as midfielder
Antonio Domingo Rojas Melero (born 1984), Spanish football player
Ariel Rojas (born 1986), Argentine football midfielder
Arístides Rojas (born 1970), Paraguayan footballer
Arturo Montiel Rojas (born 1943), Mexican politician

B
Benigno Filomeno de Rojas (1821–1865), lawyer and Dominican politician
Benjamin Rojas (born 1985), Argentine actor and singer
Bernardo de Sandoval y Rojas (1546–1618), Spanish bishop and cardinal, Grand Inquisitor of Spain from 1608 to 1618
Bruno Rojas (born 1993), Bolivian sprinter

C
Carlos Rojas (footballer) (1928–?), Chilean football midfielder
Carmine Rojas, bass player and Rod Stewart's bass player and music director
Christopher Rojas (born 1982), composer, musician, songwriter, and record producer
Clare Rojas (born 	1976), American artist
Clara Rojas (born 1964), Colombian tax lawyer, university lecturer, and campaign manager
Claudio Rojas (born 1973), retired Guatemalan football midfielder
Clemente Rojas (born 1952), Colombian boxer
Cookie Rojas (born 1939), former Major League Baseball player, manager and coach
Cristián Rojas (born 1985), Chilean footballer
Cristóbal Rojas (artist) (1857–1890), Venezuelan painter
Cristóbal de Rojas (1555–1614), a Spanish military engineer and architect

D
Darío Rojas (born 1960), retired Bolivian football goalkeeper
Diego de Rojas (died 1544), 16th-century Spanish Conquistador
Diego Rojas (born 1995), Chilean footballer
Don Rojas (born 1949), journalist and political commentator from St. Vincent

E
Eladio Rojas (1934–1991), former Chilean footballer
Elio Rojas (born 1982), featherweight boxer from the Dominican Republic
Eloy Rojas (born 1967), professional boxer in the Featherweight division
Emilio Rojas (born 1984), American recording artist and rapper from Rochester, New York
Esteban Rojas Tovar, Colombian educator, philanthropist, bishop of the diocese of Garzón
Euclides Rojas (born 1967), Cuban-born coach and player development official in Major League Baseball

F
Felipe Rojas (born 1986), Chilean footballer
Fernando de Rojas (c. 1465 – 1541), Castilian author
Francisca Rojas, believed to be the first criminal found guilty through fingerprint evidence
Francisco de Rojas Zorrilla (1607–1660), Spanish dramatist
Francisco Goméz de Sandoval y Rojas, Duke of Lerma, Duke of Lerma (1552/1553–1625)
Francisco Rojas Rojas (born 1974), Chilean football defender
Francisco Rojas Tollinchi (1911–1965), Puerto Rican poet, civic leader and journalist
Francisco Rojas Toledo (born 1956), Mexican politician

G
Genaro Vázquez Rojas (1931–1972), former school teacher, militant and guerrilla fighter
Geraldin Rojas (born 1981), contemporary Argentine tango dancer, also known as Geraldin Paludi
Gonzalo Rojas (1916–2011), Chilean poet
Guadalupe Pérez Rojas (born 1994), Argentine tennis player
Guillermo Rojas (born 1983), Mexican football left back
Gustavo Andrés Rojas (born 1988), Colombian football defender
Gustavo Rojas (footballer) (born 1988), Colombian football defender
Gustavo Rojas (golfer) (born 1967), Argentine professional golfer
Gustavo Rojas Pinilla (1900–1975), Colombian General, military dictator of Colombia from 1953 to 1957
Gustavo Rojas Pinilla International Airport, international airport on the San Andrés Island, Colombia

H
Héctor Rojas Herazo (1920–2002), Colombian writer
Henry Rojas (born 1987), football striker from Colombia
Heriberto Rojas, former Costa Rican footballer
Hernando de Manrique de Rojas, commander of Spanish forces sent in late 1562 to destroy the French fort at Port Royal
Homar Rojas (born 1964), former player and a manager in Minor League Baseball
Hugo Ballivian Rojas (1901–1993), de facto President of Bolivia 1951–1952

I
Ibrahim Rojas (born 1975), Cuban sprint canoeist
Isaac Rojas (1906–1993), Argentine Admiral of the Navy and de facto Vice President
Iván Guzmán de Rojas (1934–2022), Bolivian research scientist and the creator of Atamiri

J
Jesús Kiki Rojas (born 1964), former professional boxer in the super flyweight division
Jesus Rojas (1950–1991), Nicaraguan and a major leader of the FMLN resistance movement in El Salvador
Jimena Rojas Cordero (born 2004), Costa Rican international sword fighter
Joao Rojas (born 1989), Ecuadorian footballer
Joaquín Rojas (1938–2018), Filipino former basketball player
Joel Humberto Rojas Pérez (born 1968), Cuban painter
John Rojas, Jr. (died 2000), founder of the Chula Vista Historical Society
Jorge A. Rojas (born 1940), general authority of The Church of Jesus Christ of Latter-day Saints from 1991 to 1996
Jorge Alberto Rojas (born 1977), Venezuelan football midfielder
Jorge Rojas (footballer) (born 1993), Paraguayan international footballer
Jorge Rojas Justicia (born 1983), Spanish footballer
José Antonio Rojas (born 1987), Chilean footballer
José Domingo Gómez Rojas (1896–1920), Chilean poet
José Joaquín Rojas (born 1985), Spanish professional road bicycle racer
José López Portillo y Rojas (1850–1923), Mexican lawyer, politician and man-of-letters
José Manuel Rojas (born 1983), Chilean defender who currently plays for Universidad de Chile
José María Rojas Garrido (1824–1883), Colombian Senator
José Manuel Rojas (footballer, born 1952), football player from Costa Rica
José Rojas (baseball) (born 1993), American baseball player
Jose Rojas (racquetball) (born 1990), professional racquetball player
Josh Rojas (born 1994), American baseball player
Juan Carlos Rojas (born 1984), Mexican footballer
Juan Fernández de Rojas (1750–1819), Spanish historian, writer and humorist
Juan Pablo Rojas Paúl (1826–1905), President of Venezuela from 1888 to 1890
Juan Rodrigo Rojas (born 1988), Paraguayan football midfielder
Julian Guillermo Rojas (born 1990), Colombian footballer

L
Leonardo Ly Rojas (born 1985), Costa Rican footballer
Leonel Herrera Rojas (born 1978), former Chilean footballer
Liberato Marcial Rojas (1870–1922), provisional President of Paraguay July 6, 1911 – February 28, 1912
Lorena Rojas (born 1972), Mexican actress and singer best known for soap operas
Luis Giampietri Rojas (born 1940), retired admiral of the Peruvian Navy
Luis Rojas (disambiguation), several people
Luis Rojas Mena (1917–2009), Mexican Bishop of the Roman Catholic Church

M
Manuel Antonio Hermoso Rojas (born 1935), Canarian politician
Manuel Rojas (Author) (1896–1973), Chilean writer and journalist
Manuel Rojas (footballer) (born 1954), retired football midfielder from Chile
Manuel Rojas (independence leader) (1820–18??), Commander of the Liberation Army against Spanish rule in Puerto Rico
Marco Antonio Rojas, Costa Rican goalkeeper
Marco Rojas, (born 1991), New Zealand footballer
Marcus Rojas (born 1962), tubist from New York City, best known for his work in jazz
Margot Rojas Mendoza (1903–1996), Mexican pianist and teacher
María Eugenia Rojas Correa (born 1932), retired Colombian political figure
Marielys Rojas (born 1986), Venezuelan athlete specializing in the high jump
Mario Luis Pavez Rojas (born 1960), Santiago Chile.
Marlon Rojas (born 1979), Trinidad and Tobago soccer player
Marta Rojas (1928–2021), Cuban journalist and novelist
Matías Rojas (disambiguation), multiple people
Mauricio Rojas (born 1950), Swedish politician, political economist, member of the Riksdag since 2002
Mauricio Rojas Toro (born 1978), Chilean football (soccer) player
Mel Rojas (born 1966), pitcher with a 10-year career from 1990 to 1999
Memo Rojas, Mexican-born race car driver
Michelle Rojas, (born 1987), American voice actress affiliated with Funimation
Miguel Rojas (footballer), Colombian football defender
Miguel Rojas (baseball), Venezuelan baseball player
Mike Rojas (born 1963), American professional baseball coach and player development official
Minnie Rojas (1933–2002), relief pitcher in Major League Baseball
Moisés Rojas Alou (born 1966), former Dominican-American outfielder in Major League Baseball

N
Nerio Rojas (1890–1971), Argentine physician and writer on forensic medicine
Nicolas Nunez Rojas (born 1984), Chilean football (soccer) midfielder
Nicolás Rojas Acosta (1873–1946), Argentine botanist and pteridologist
Noel Guzmán Boffil Rojas (1954–2021), Cuban painter
Nydia Rojas (born 1980), American singer of Mexican/Cuban/Yaqui Indian heritage
Nydia Rojas (album) (1996), the first album released by American singer Nydia Rojas

O
Octavio Beras Rojas (1906–1990), Dominican prelate of the Roman Catholic Church
Omaira Rojas Cabrera (born 1967), FARC guerrilla
Oscar Rojas (Chilean footballer) (born 1958), Chilean football defender
Óscar Rojas (Costa Rican footballer) (born 1979), Costa Rican footballer
Óscar Rojas (Mexican footballer) (born 1981), Mexican football player
Oscar Emilio Rojas (born 1979), Costa Rican-Mexican naturalized football midfielder
Óscar Pérez Rojas (born 1973), Mexican football goalkeeper
Óscar Ricardo Rojas (born 1988), Mexican footballer

P
Pablo Rojas Paz (1896–1956), Argentine writer born in Tucumán
Paola Rojas (born 1976), Mexico City television news anchor
Pedro de Rojas, Spanish lawyer and colonial official in the Philippines and New Spain
Percy Rojas (born 1949), retired football midfielder from Peru
Peter Rojas (born 1975), the co-founder of technology blogs Gizmodo and Engadget

R
Rafael Hernández Rojas (born 1946), Mexican former swimmer
Rafael Rojas (actor) (born 1961), Mexican male fashion model and actor
Raúl Rojas (born 1955), professor of informatics and mathematics at the Free University of Berlin
Raul Rojas (1941–2012), Mexican American featherweight boxer
René Rojas Galdames (1919–1988), Chilean lawyer and diplomat
Ricardo Francisco Rojas (born 1974), Chilean football (soccer) player
Ricardo Ismael Rojas (born 1971), Argentine born former football defender
Ricardo Rojas (boxer) (born 1955), retired boxer from Cuba
Ricardo Rojas (writer) (1882–1957), Argentine journalist and writer
Ricardo Rojas Frías (born 1955), retired boxer from Cuba
Richard Rojas (born 1975), Bolivian football midfielder
Roberto Rojas (Chilean footballer) (born 1957), Chilean goalkeeper
Roberto Rojas (Peruvian footballer) (1955–1991), Peruvian football defender
Roberto Rojas (1966–2022), Bolivian politician
Roberto Rojas (Spanish footballer) (born 1974), Spanish footballer
Rodrigo Rojas (Paraguayan footballer) (born 1988), Paraguayan footballer
Rodrigo Rojas DeNegri (1967–1986), young photographer burnt alive in Chile
Roger Rojas, Honduran football player (Rojas) Producer

S
Samuel Moreno Rojas (born 1960), Colombian American politician
Sandra Rojas (born 1973), Mexican sprint canoeist
Sergio Rojas (Argentine footballer) (born 1973), Argentine former football player
Sergio Rojas (Paraguayan footballer) (1940–2010), Paraguyan football player
Simón de Rojas (1552–1624), Spanish priest of the Trinitarian Order
Simon de Rojas Clemente y Rubio (1777–1827), Spanish botanist
Sixto Rojas (1982–2007), Paraguayan footballer

T
Teodoro Rojas (1877–1954), Paraguayan botanist
Tito Rojas a.k.a. "El Gallo" (The Rooster) (1955–2020), salsa singer and bandleader
Tomás Rojas (disambiguation), several people
Toribio Rojas, former coach of the Puerto Rico Islanders, a USL soccer team

V
Vicente Rojas Lizcano (1879–1943), aka Biófilo Panclasta, individualist anarchist writer and activist
Victor Joy Way Rojas (born 1945), former Peruvian politician
Víctor Julio Suárez Rojas (1953–2010), high-ranking member of the Revolutionary Armed Forces of Colombia (FARC)
Victor Rojas (born 1968), former member of the Texas Rangers radio broadcast team

Y
Yulimar Rojas (born 1995), Venezuelan track and field athlete

See also
 Roxas, archaic spelling
 Rojas (disambiguation)

Spanish-language surnames
Surnames of Colombian origin